Acton Trussell and Bednall is a civil parish in the South Staffordshire district of Staffordshire, England. As the name indicates, it contains the two villages Acton Trussell, Bednall. Teddesley Hay is part of the grouped parish council. The population of the civil parish at the 2011 census was 1,248.

See also
Listed buildings in Acton Trussell, Bednall and Teddesley Hay

References

Civil parishes in Staffordshire
South Staffordshire District